Shri Panchmukhi Hanuman Mandir is a historic Hindu temple in Pakistan. It is located in the Soldier Bazaar in Karachi in the Sindh Province of Pakistan It is a 1,500 year old temple. It is the only temple in the world that has the natural statue of  Lord Hanuman.  It is declared as a national heritage under the Sindh Cultural Heritage (Preservation) Act 1994.

Religious significance

It is believed that during the exile the Lord Ram visited the place where the temple stands. After sometime, a statue of Panchamukhi Hanuman was excavated from that place and a temple was built on the spot. It is believed that circumambulating the Panchamukhi Hanuman idol 11 or 21 times fulfils the wishes of devotees.

History

The current temple structure was built about 1500 years ago. The temple was spread over 2,609 square feet. Later, land grabbers encroached on half of this land. The district court ordered that the encroached land be returned to the temple in 2006. Despite the order, many encroachers continued to occupy the temple area. In 2012, the temple started renovated using the funds collected from Hindu community and from the Muttahida Qaumi Movement Several Hindu deity idols were excavated from the temple site in 2019 as part of the reconstruction operation.

See also
Ramapir Temple Tando Allahyar
Umarkot Shiv Mandir
Darya Lal Mandir
Hinglaj Mata mandir
Kalka Cave Temple
Parbrahm Ashram

References

Hindu temples in Sindh
Hindu temples in Karachi
Buildings and structures in Karachi
Heritage sites in Karachi
Hanuman temples